The Tournament of Bands (TOB) is one of the largest competitive band organizations in the United States and is one of several major circuits in the mid-Atlantic states (other circuits include Cavalcade of Bands and USBands). TOB was founded in 1972 by the National Judges Association and currently has 439 member bands. It provides a large array of competitive performance opportunities including marching band, indoor guard, majorette, percussion, and dance teams. TOB sanctions approximately 140 field band events as well as about 100 indoor events annually.

Membership
TOB is open to any elementary, middle, junior high, or senior high school, as well as any college or university. It also has an independent category which can be anyone within a certain age limit. Currently, TOB is divided into 13 Chapters across 9 states. The membership by state is as follows:

Delaware: 22
Maryland: 70
New Jersey: 61
New York: 4
North Carolina: 3
Ohio: 4
Pennsylvania: 225
Virginia: 27
West Virginia: 24

Marching band
The Tournament of Bands sanctions about 140 marching band competitions throughout each fall, corresponding roughly with high school football season. Bands are judged on a 100-point linear scale by judges both on the field and in the press box. Bands are also divided into groups based on their size, and judged only within their group. Sizes are as follows:

 Group 1 – up to 30 musicians and a maximum of 30 auxiliary
 Group 2 – 31 to 50 musicians and a maximum of 50 auxiliary
 Group 3 – 51 to 75 musicians and a maximum of 75 auxiliary
 Group 4 – 76 or greater

In addition to the group sizes, there are three levels of performance classification that a member may elect to participate:

1. OPEN CLASS (formerly Championship) 
This level is what has been offered in the past - bands will compete throughout the season for TOB scoring and conclude their season with the annual Chapter Championship and qualification for the annual Atlantic Coast Championship.

2. A CLASS (formerly Regional)
This level is for the less experienced bands - bands will compete throughout the season, with emphasis on education and development, but still follow the TOB scoring. Student education, development, and staff training will be emphasized throughout the season.

3. FESTIVAL CLASS
This level will introduce bands to TOB - bands will compete, but at more of an exhibition level with awards based on a rating program without the announcement of a numeric score or place. Student education, development, and staff training will be emphasized throughout the season. This season concludes with the annual Chapter Championship, still following the rating system.
 
 Every TOB Show will offer the three levels of participation - in every group
 Chapter Championships will include three levels of participation/awards
 The Atlantic Coast Championship will only be offered to the OPEN CLASS (formerly Championship) and A CLASS (formerly Regional) participants.

List of winners of Atlantic Coast Championships

{*} - Shows highest score ever in Tournament of Bands.

ACC Consecutive Win Records 

 1992: Lake-Lehman sets the record w/ 6 consecutive wins.
 1993: Governor Livingston breaks Lake-Lehman's winning streak and ties the record.
 2003: Middle Township breaks the record with its 7th consecutive wins
 2017: West Deptford breaks the record with 8x Consecutive wins

Indoor activities
The Tournament Indoor Association is one of several circuits for indoor shows in the mid-Atlantic states (other circuits include MAIN, Cavalcade, KIDA, and TRWEA). The Tournament Indoor Association, commonly referred to as TIA, sanctions competitions for indoor guard, marching percussion, concert percussion, twirlers, and dance team units. The indoor season generally runs from late January to the first weekend in May. Units can be either scholastic or independent. Scholastic units are affiliated with a school. Independent units are usually not affiliated with a school. Classifications are as follows:

 Scholastic Elementary/Independent Cadet – For elementary school students or students under the age of 10.
 Scholastic Middle/Independent Junior – For students in middle school or up to the age of 14.
 Novice A – For color guards only
 Novice – For percussion, dance teams and twirlers
 Intermediate A – for color guards and percussion
 A class
 Open class
 World class
 University – All members must be students at the university and not over the age of 22. Judged on Open class sheets.
 Senior – All members must be 23 or older. Judged on open class sheets.

Units are divided into 13 chapters based on geography. Any unit which has participated in one contest throughout the season is eligible to participate in their respective Chapter Championships, which are usually held the last weekend in April, although in order to be a chapter champion, you must compete in two shows. Any unit which has participated in 4 contests throughout the season and Chapter Championships can compete in the Atlantic Coast Championships, which are held the first weekend in May in Wildwood, NJ. Depending on the number of groups competing in a single class, the tournament can have multiple rounds in which the higher scoring groups advance.

References

Tournament of Bands Home Page
TOB Info - TOB Scores and Rankings
TOB Chapter 10

Marching band competitions